The Most Dangerous Man in the World (translit. Akhtar Ragol fil Alam) is a 1967 Egyptian crime comedy film film directed by Niazi Mostafa

Cast 
 Fouad El Mohandes as Zaki/Mr. X
 Shwikar as Nadia
 Suheir El Babbly as Sonia, the mob boss
 Adel Adham as Interpol agent
 Cannan Wasfi as Marshello
 Sami Sabry as Lucian

See also 
 Cinema of Egypt
 Lists of Egyptian films
 List of Egyptian films of the 1960s
 List of Egyptian films of 1967

References

External links 
 
 The Most Dangerous Man in the World on elCinema

1960s Arabic-language films
1967 films
1960s action comedy films
1960s crime comedy films
1960s crime action films
Egyptian action comedy films
Egyptian crime comedy films
Egyptian crime action films
Egyptian black-and-white films
Films directed by Niazi Mostafa
Films shot in Egypt
1967 comedy films